Prisoner of the Caucasus (also translated Captive in the Caucasus) may refer to:

 The Prisoner of the Caucasus (poem) (Кавказский пленник; translit. Kavkazskiy plennik), a poem by Alexander Pushkin first published in 1820-21
 The Prisoner of the Caucasus (opera), an 1883 opera by César Cui based on Pushkin's poem
 "The Prisoner of the Caucasus" (story), an 1872 novella by Leo Tolstoy
 Prisoner of the Mountains, a 1996 Russian film based on Tolstoy's novella
The Prisoner of the Caucasus, a variant translation for Kidnapping, Caucasian Style (Кавказская пленница, или Новые приключения Шурика, translit. Kavkazskaya plennitsa, ili Novie priklucheniya Shurika), a 1967 Russian comedy film directed by Leonid Gaidai